Witnesses: The Untold War in Afghanistan is a Canadian documentary film, directed by Martyn Burke and released in 1988. The film is a portrait of the Soviet–Afghan War of the 1980s, as told through the testimonies of various people who had been on the ground as first-hand witnesses to the events.

The film premiered at the 1988 Festival of Festivals.

The film received a Genie Award nomination for Best Feature Length Documentary at the 10th Genie Awards in 1989.

References

External links
 

1988 films
1988 documentary films
Canadian documentary films
English-language Canadian films
Documentary films about the Soviet–Afghan War
1980s English-language films
1980s Canadian films